Diamond City is a hamlet in southern Alberta, Canada within the Lethbridge County. The community was so named on account of deposits of coal near the original town site, a resource also called "black diamond".

Diamond City was first settled at the turn of the 20th century by farmers, ranchers and miners. The community grew rapidly when a coal mine was opened in 1905. Previously an incorporated town, Diamond City dissolved on June 30, 1937.

Demographics 

See also 
List of communities in Alberta
List of designated places in Alberta
List of former urban municipalities in Alberta
List of hamlets in Alberta

References 

Hamlets in Alberta
Lethbridge County
Designated places in Alberta
Former towns in Alberta